Columbia Park is an urban park located in and administered by the city of Marshfield, Wisconsin.

The  park dates its history back to 1875, when it was called "Northside City Park". The present name was adopted in 1915.

References

Geography of Wood County, Wisconsin
Parks in Wisconsin